David Allen MBE (24 October 1937 – 13 December 2011) was a teacher, trade unionist and politician from Northern Ireland.

A member of the Vanguard Unionist Progressive Party, he represented the group in the Northern Ireland Constitutional Convention. He was elected to Ballymena Borough Council in 1973, topping the poll in the C District Electoral Area. He retained the seat in 1977, albeit as a "Ratepayers" candidate, having left the Vanguard in the interim. 

In November 1976 Allen proposed a motion banning Ballymena's local Gaelic Athletic Association (GAA) from using council facilities; the motion passed unanimously. Allen described the GAA as "bigoted, sectarian" with an "antiquated" ruleset. In a television interview about the motion, Allen suggested he would be justified in calling for the GAA to be outlawed and made illegal in Northern Ireland.  

Allen was a pupil of Ballymena Academy. A teacher by profession, he trained at Queen's University Belfast and Stranmillis College before teaching at primary level in his native Ballymena, initially at Harryville PS before moving to Ballykeel PS. Known to his pupils as "Duck", he was deputy headmaster at the latter school. Allen was active in the Ulster Teachers' Union and became general secretary of the body in 1978, holding the position for twenty years. A prominent media figure during his time in charge, Allen's work earned him the nickname "children's champion".

Allen was married twice and had one daughter. Following his retirement he settled in Banbridge, while also keeping a house in Cornwall. He suffered a stroke in 2011 and died soon after, aged 74. He was buried in Banbridge following a service at the town's Bannside Presbyterian Church.

References

1937 births
2011 deaths
Members of the Northern Ireland Constitutional Convention
Vanguard Unionist Progressive Party politicians
General secretaries of British trade unions
Presbyterians from Northern Ireland
People from Ballymena
Members of the Order of the British Empire
Alumni of Queen's University Belfast
Alumni of Stranmillis University College
People educated at Ballymena Academy
Schoolteachers from Northern Ireland